Batrachorhina nebulosa is a species of beetle in the family Cerambycidae. It was described by Léon Fairmaire in 1904. It is known from Madagascar.

References

Batrachorhina
Beetles described in 1904